The Siberian dace (Leuciscus baicalensis) is a freshwater species of cyprinid fish, found in Siberian rivers draining to the Arctic Ocean, from the Ob to the Kolyma in the east, as well as in Mongolia and in Ulungur Lake and Ulungur River in Xinjiang, China.

The complete mitochondrial genome of Leuciscus baicalensis has a mostly conserved structural organization and it is 16,606 bp in size. It consisted of 37 genes (13 protein-coding genes, 22 transfer RNA genes and 2 ribosomal RNA genes), and 2 main non-coding regions (the control region and the origin of the light strand replication).

References 

Leuciscus
Taxa named by Benedykt Dybowski
Fish described in 1874